Tarache toddi is a moth of the family Noctuidae. The species was found in 2009 by Clifford D. Ferris and Donald Lafontaine in southwestern North America.

References

Acontiinae
Moths of North America
Moths described in 2009